Kebu may refer to:

 Kebu language, also known as Akebu, one of the Ghana–Togo Mountain languages spoken by the Akebu people of southern Togo and southeastern Ghana
 Kebu Stewart, American retired basketball player
 Kebu, Finnish alternative name for kebab (both are used) 
 Kebu (musician) (Sebastian Teir), Finnish composer and musician